Jayanagar is a Village Development Committee in Rautahat District in the Narayani Zone of south-eastern Nepal. At the time of the 1991 Nepal census it had a population of 3153 people residing in 570 individual households.

Jayanagar means "Victory Town".

References

Populated places in Rautahat District